Tan Teng-pho (2 February 1895 – 25 March 1947), was a Taiwanese painter and politician.  In 1926, his oil painting Street of Chiayi was featured in the seventh  in Japan, which was the first time a Taiwanese artist's work could be displayed at the exhibition. Tan devoted his life to education and creation, and was greatly concerned about the development of humanist culture in Taiwan. He was not only devoted to the improvement of his own painting, but also to the promotion of the aesthetic education of the Taiwanese people. He was killed as a result of the February 28 Incident, a 1947 uprising in Taiwan which was repressed by the Kuomintang (KMT).

Early life 
Tan was born in Kagi (Chiayi), during the Japanese colonial period, into a poor family that could not invest in his artist talents. After attending college in Taihoku, he returned to his hometown to work as a teacher, a job he held for seven years. Tan then earned enough money to attend the Tokyo University of the Arts, and graduated in 1929. Upon graduation, he moved to Shanghai for four years, where he taught art. Tan returned to Kagi in 1933, and joined the city's Preparatory Committee to Welcome the National Government in 1945. In 1946, Tan was elected as a member of the Chiayi City Council and joined the Kuomintang.

Education
He enrolled in the Taiwan Governor-General's National Language School in 1913, where he studied Western-style watercolor painting under Ishikawa Kinichiro. In 1924, he went to mainland Japan to receive formal academic training in art under Japanese oil painter Tanabe Itaru at the Normal Education Division in Painting of the Tokyo School of Fine Arts (today's Tokyo University of the Arts). Tan also studied privately under Japanese luminarist Okada Saburosuke at his Hongō Painting Institute.

Work and public life
After completing his graduate program in 1929, he moved to Shanghai to teach at Xinhua Art College and Changming Art School. During his stay in Shanghai, he was influenced by the traditional Chinese painting of Ni Yunlin and Bada Shanren, and began to develop a distinctive style that fuses the lyrical essence of Chinese landscape painting with Western painting techniques. His work includes oil painting, glue color painting, and sketching while his themes center on landscapes and portraits, mostly inspired by everyday scenes around him.

In 1926, his work Street of Kagi was selected for the 7th , making him the first Taiwanese painter to have an oil painting accepted for the exhibition. After returning to Taiwan, the focus of his work shifted to the scenery of his hometown, as he showcased the charm of the Taiwanese landscape with plein-air works painted in Tamsui, Kagi and Tainan.

Painter  has described Tan's artistic style as clumsy and awkward, which biographer Ko Tsung-min believed was intentional, comparing Tan's work to Vincent van Gogh and Pablo Picasso's Les Demoiselles d'Avignon.

Besides painting, Tan was also actively involved in Taiwanese art movements. Among other art movement activities, he co-founded the Chi-Hsing Painting Society in 1926, co-founded the Tai-Yang Art Society with Yang Sanlang and Liao Chi-chun in 1934, and helped young artists in Kagi establish the Qingchen Fine Art Association in 1940. His contributions to broadening the influence of art in Taiwan also extended to his service as a Chiayi City Councilor, and as a juror at the first Taiwan Provincial Art Exhibition after the handover of Taiwan in 1945.

Death 
Due to the February 28 Incident, severe conflict occurred in 1947 between the Chiayi citizens and the KMT, whose military was trapped inside the city's airport.  The "February 28 Incident Committee" was established, composed of Tan and five others who would approach the military as representatives of peace.  The military, however, captured four of them, including Tan, and released the remaining two.

On the morning of 25 March 1947, after being tied up with wire, the four were forced to march from the city's police station to the train station, where the other three were shot dead in public. His son, Chen Shigemitsu, recalled that as soon as hearing that his arrested father was paraded, he went onto the street and found his father on a military vehicle at Chiayi Fountain. He followed the contingent and realized what would happen when his sight suddenly met his father's.

When the vehicle stopped at Chiayi Station, the army strafed the square in front of the station, with bystanders fleeing in disorder. Tan Teng-pho was the last one pushed off the vehicle. Soldiers shot at him from three meters. The first shot missed but the second penetrated his chest, and Tan fell forward. The Kuomintang forbade the families from collecting the corpses immediately, so Tan's remains were left to decompose on the street for three days, until his wife and a photographer she had hired to take pictures of the aftermath collected them.

Legacy 
Tan's work Chiayi Park was sold for $5,794,100 HKD at a Hong Kong auction on 28 April 2002.

Tamsui, an oil painting, was purchased in 2006 for $4.5 million (NT$144 million) by Pierre Chen, setting a world record for an oil painting by an ethnically Chinese artist.

In 2015, a Google Doodle commemorated his 120th birthday.

His paintings form the artwork for Lin Man-chiu's picture book 《戴帽子的女孩》[The Girl in the Hat]

Tan's grandson Pu Hao-ming also became an artist.

References

External links

 Photograph of Chen's body after he was killed
 Starting Out from 23.5°N: Chen Cheng-po

1895 births
1947 deaths
20th-century executions by China
20th-century Taiwanese painters
Executed artists
Executed Republic of China people
Executed Taiwanese people
February 28 incident
Han Taiwanese
Kuomintang politicians in Taiwan
People executed by the Republic of China by firearm
People from Chiayi
Taiwanese city councilors
Taiwanese people of Hoklo descent
Tokyo University of the Arts alumni